British Standard Wire Gauge (often abbreviated to Standard Wire Gauge or SWG) is a unit for denoting wire size given by BS 3737:1964 (now withdrawn).  It is also known as the Imperial Wire Gauge or British Standard Gauge.  Use of SWG sizes has fallen greatly in popularity, but they are still used as a measure of thickness in guitar strings and some electrical wire. Cross sectional area in square millimetres is now the more usual size measurement for wires used in electrical installation cables.  The current British Standard for metallic materials such as wire and sheet is BS 6722:1986, which is a solely metric standard.

History 
SWG was fixed by Order of Council August 23, 1883.  It was constructed by improving the Birmingham Wire Gauge.  It was made a legal standard on 1 March, 1884, by the British Board of Trade.  SWG is not to be confused with American wire gauge, which has a similar but not interchangeable numbering scheme.

Standard 
A table of the gauge numbers and wire diameters is shown below. Sizes are specified as wire diameters, stated in thou and tenths of a thou (mils and tenths). The wire diameter diminishes with increasing size number.

The system as a whole approximates an exponential curve, plotting diameter against gauge-number (each size is a approximately a constant multiple of the previous size).  The weight per unit length diminishes by an average of approximately 20% at each step.  Because the weight per unit length is related to the cross sectional area, and therefore to the square of the diameter, the diameter diminishes by approximately 10.6%:

However, the system is piecewise linear, only approximating the exponential curve loosely.  Thus, it runs in constant steps of  through the range No. 49 - No. 39 and of  through No. 39 - No. 30.

See also
 
IEC 60228, the metric wire-size standard used in most parts of the world.
Circular mil, Electrical industry standard for wires larger than 4/0.
American Wire Gauge (AWG), used primarily in the US and Canada
Stubs Iron Wire Gauge
Jewelry wire gauge
Body jewelry sizes
Electrical wiring
Number 8 wire, a term used in the New Zealand vernacular

References

Wire gauges
3737